Ștefan Filotti (19 September 1922 – 28 September 1969) was a Romanian forward.

International career
Ștefan Filotti played 13 games at international level for Romania, making his debut in a friendly which ended 2–0 against Croatia. He scored his only goal in a 4–1 victory against Albania. Filotti also played in a 3–0 loss against Hungary at the 1947 Balkan Cup and in a 2–0 loss against Czechoslovakia at the 1954 World Cup qualifiers.

Honours
Rapid București
Divizia B: 1952, 1955
Cupa României: 1941–42
Cupa Primăverii: 1957

Notes

References

External links

1922 births
1969 deaths
Romanian footballers
Liga I players
Liga II players
FC Rapid București players
Association football forwards
Romania international footballers
Sportspeople from Brăila